Sergey Shabalin (born 24 August 1971) is a Kazakhstani fencer. He competed in the individual épée event at the 2000 Summer Olympics.

References

External links
 

1971 births
Living people
Kazakhstani male épée fencers
Olympic fencers of Kazakhstan
Fencers at the 2000 Summer Olympics
Asian Games medalists in fencing
Fencers at the 1994 Asian Games
Fencers at the 1998 Asian Games
Fencers at the 2002 Asian Games
Fencers at the 2006 Asian Games
Fencers at the 2010 Asian Games
Asian Games gold medalists for Kazakhstan
Asian Games silver medalists for Kazakhstan
Asian Games bronze medalists for Kazakhstan
Medalists at the 1994 Asian Games
Medalists at the 1998 Asian Games
Medalists at the 2002 Asian Games
Medalists at the 2006 Asian Games
Medalists at the 2010 Asian Games
Sportspeople from Semey
20th-century Kazakhstani people
21st-century Kazakhstani people